The Tishbi Winery, located in Binyamina, is Israel's sixth largest with production of about 1 million bottles of wine annually. Its wines are sold in 25 countries.

The Tishbi family was commissioned by Baron Edmond de Rothschild to plant the first modern vineyard in Israel. In 1984 Jonathan Tishbi founded the Tishbi winery.

References

External links 
Winery homepage

Wineries of Israel
Companies established in 1984
Binyamina-Giv'at Ada